Direct provision is a system of asylum seeker accommodation used in the Republic of Ireland. The system has been criticised by human rights organisations as illegal, inhuman and degrading. The system, operated by the International Protection Accommodation Services (IPAS) of the Department of Children, Equality, Disability, Integration and Youth, provides international protection applicants with accommodation and a small allowance. International protection applicants in direct provision are usually entitled to state-funded medical care, and children have full mainstream access to the education system.

History 
Direct provision was originally introduced as an emergency measure in 1999. In 2002 there were almost 12,000 applications for asylum. At the start of 2014, there were 4,360 people in direct provision, with more than 3,000 people having been in the system for two or more years. At the same time, there were more than 1,600 people who have spent five or more years in direct provision.

There were approximately 7,400 adults and children living in the 38 direct provision centres across 17 counties in Ireland by the end of April 2020.

In February 2021, the Government of Ireland announced a plan to end direct provision by 2024.

Human rights concerns
The length of time people spend in direct provision has been criticised by human rights watchdogs, with the Irish Human Rights and Equality Commission calling the delays faced by asylum applicants as "systemic and pernicious."

In CA v. Minister for Justice and Equality, a claim was made that direct provision was "inhuman and degrading", asserting that the system is illegal under both the Irish Constitution and the European Convention on Human Rights, and all other international human rights conventions that Ireland has subscribed to. This case was vigorously defended by the State on all grounds, including on the basis that it fulfills Ireland's obligations, that it is broadly in line with (and in many cases better than) the situation in other EU states, and that at a time of competing calls for finite resources, it was not feasible for the State to grant the right to work, access to full social welfare and access to the public housing and/or rent supplement to asylum seekers.

In his judgement on 14 November 2014, Justice Colm Mac Eochaidh found against the applicants on the substantive point of "inhuman and degrading treatment", but struck down the rules at that time regarding unannounced room inspections; the sign-in requirement; the requirement to notify intended absence; the rules on visitors and the lack of an independent complaints procedure. Those points were subsequently addressed.  
The Irish Government's Special Rapporteur on Child Protection, Dr. Geoffrey Shannon, has called it "institutionalised poverty". As of April 2020 adults receive €38.80 per week and children €29.80. Some centres have cooking facilities, but the majority have canteen style eating halls. These have been criticised both for the quality of food, and for the attitude of the canteen workers when it comes to accommodating specific dietary needs. Many child asylum seekers have been sent here alone while some are born into the direct provision life and that is all they have ever known. In June 2014, there were more than 1,000 asylum cases waiting to be heard in the High Court. The Irish Refugee Council has reported that young people living in Direct Provision centres are more prone to depression and suicide, and in the case of three young people in particular, aged between 11 and 17, stated "for different reasons, these three young people have all expressed the view that they can’t see the purpose of living."

According to responses to parliamentary debates and the RIA, the majority of adults in direct provision have had their initial asylum applications rejected and are either appealing this or seeking to remain in Ireland under other criteria.

On October 31, 2018 Donnah Sibanda Vuma asked staff at the direct provision centre in Knockalisheen where she resided for bread and milk for her sick child. The staff refused and told her that they had strict instructions not to give any food outside of canteen hours. The Department of Justice said that the Reception and Integration Agency said it was because of a miscommunication involving a new staff member. The Department of Justice described what happened as "regrettable". Donnah Vuma was living at the centre with her children for four years and had previously criticised direct provision centres for refusing to allow residents to use cooking facilities.

In 2020, direct provision was widely criticised as not conducive to the COVID-19 restrictions on social distancing, self-isolating, and cocooning for those living in its Centres. In particular groups have highlighted the impact on children when there is no access to outdoor or leisure spaces, and the shared facilities with numerous other residents. Some advocacy groups such as Movement of Asylum Seekers in Ireland have been involved in Black Lives Matter protests and demonstrations in Ireland highlighting the treatment of people of colour in direct provision. Taoiseach Leo Varadkar responded by commenting that there was no direct comparison between the deaths of black people in the United States and the experiences of those living in direct provision.

Mount Trenchard in Limerick, widely considered "the worst direct provision centre in the country due to poor facilities, overcrowding and isolation", closed in February 2020, after pressure from advocacy groups, including the publication of a report by Doras based upon interviews with residents.

Health and healthcare 
In the direct provision system, refugees seeking asylum in Ireland have access to medical cards (which are also allocated to low income individuals in Ireland). These cards allow individuals to receive their medical care and prescriptions for free. However, because many asylum seekers experience mental health conditions and concerns in addition to any health problems they may have, researchers recommend that asylum seekers in DP have access to a multidisciplinary healthcare team overseeing their care.

Asylum seekers are more likely to experience certain mental health conditions than the general population. A 2009 paper from the Irish College of Psychiatrists stated that migrants and asylum seekers in Ireland are 10x more likely to suffer from PTSD, and 3x more likely to suffer from psychosis. 53% of asylum seekers in direct provision reported having been tortured before their arrival in Ireland. People in direct provision also experience a variety of stressors that are not as prevalent in the general population including: legal status, a feeling of not being able to parent properly (due to lack of employment and inability to provide transportation for their children), not being able to have a job, uncertainty about involuntary transfers, language barriers, not being able to have access to food at a time when the canteen is not open, nutritional status of the food that is prepared for them, discrimination, and separation from their families or family members. Irish psychologists have stated the direct provision system is elongating the period of traumatic experiences for people in Direct Provision.

Owing to the environment at direct provision centres, children living in DP are more likely to experience problems related to overcrowding. It has been reported that children in DP are more likely to present with burns and stress-related illnesses than children in the general Irish population. Additionally, due to a combination of poverty, deprivation, social isolation, and a stressful environment at home, children and adolescents in DP are likely to experience poor mental health. Children in DP experience social isolation due to strict meal times, inability to participate in extracurriculars, visitors being banned from DP centres, and lack of transportation to and from friends’ homes. There have also been reports that children in DP experience social isolation due to stigma, racism, and bullying. Children who are alone and bored as many in DP are, are more likely to experience depression, and it is possible that children developing in a trauma-filled environment will experience cognitive impairment. Children need an environment that is both physically and emotionally safe in order to excel. Health professionals have argued that an environment with inadequately trained professionals and staff, physical abuse, lack of supervision of children, and close contact of many families with young children to unfamiliar adults is not the safe environment that children need.

Room sharing and close contact in direct provision puts asylum seekers and staff at risk of contracting COVID-19. Many asylum seekers reported that they found it difficult to follow social distancing measures when sharing amenities like rooms and bathrooms with non-family members. Additionally, because people in direct provision who are able to work often work low-income jobs with conditions that are less than ideal for social distancing (such as meat packing plants), workers and the other people in their direct provision centres are at higher risk for contracting highly communicable illnesses. Direct provision sites in Kildare and Cahersiveen have demonstrated how quickly contagious illnesses such as the COVID-19 virus can spread when many people in a small centre are in close contact.

Opposition
Direct provision-related protests have taken the form of both general protests against the direct provision system, and localised protests against individual proposed direct provision centres. The former are usually organised by the Movement of Asylum Seekers in Ireland (an advocacy group for asylum seekers) and anti-racism groups, while the latter have been accused of racism and have seen the involvement of far right groups.

Far right groups, as part of their xenophobic policy, had been encouraging people to oppose direct provision centres for some years, with little success. However, in November 2018, a proposed direct provision centre was firebombed in Moville. The following February, protests against a proposed direct provision centre in Rooskey saw another arson attack on a proposed direct provision centre. In September 2019, Oughterard saw the largest ever protests against a proposed direct provision centre, which was blockaded night and day for three weeks. Another 24/7 protest began on Achill Island the following month, which continued until 2020, the longest ever protest against a direct provision centre. Plans to accommodate asylum seekers in these four places were dropped. While there have been small protests against direct provision centres since Achill, none have been successful.

References

Irish law
Human rights abuses in Ireland
Right of asylum in the Republic of Ireland
Department of Children, Equality, Disability, Integration and Youth